Oliver Martin Wilson Warner (1903 – 14 August 1976) was a well-known British naval historian and writer.

Life and career
Warner was born in 1903 and educated at Denstone College and Caius College, Cambridge. In 1926, he succeeded Frank Swinnerton as staff reader at the publishing house of Chatto and Windus. In addition to his work as staff reader he also worked on the company's advertising material. As a young man he made contributions to magazines such as The Spectator and Time and Tide, some of which were later reproduced in his 1947 book Captains and Kings. In 1939, he published an account of his visit to an "unworldly" relative in Canada, entitled Uncle Lawrence. During the Second World War he joined the Admiralty secretariat, initially serving in the Commission and Warrant (C.W.) branch before serving on the war artists advisory committee. He later served as secretary to the naval honours and awards committee.

After the war he became deputy director of publications of the British Council, where he remained until his retirement in 1963. He worked thereafter at Chatto and Windus for another year before concentrating on writing. By the time of his death he had more than twenty books in print. He married twice, first to Dorothea Blanchard who died in 1937, by whom he had one daughter. He was married secondly to Elizabeth Strahan, with whom he had one son and one daughter.

Warner died at his home, Old Manor Cottage, Haslemere, on 14 August 1976. A memorial service was held on 21 October (Trafalgar Day) at St. Lawrence Jewry-next-Guildhall church. As well as family members, the naval historians Professor Christopher Lloyd and Captain Stephen Roskill were in attendance, among others.

Works
 The English Teapot (1948)
 Tea in Festival (1951)
 Captain Marryat: A Rediscovery (1953)
 Portrait of Lord Nelson  (1958)
 Trafalgar (1959)
 Emma Hamilton and Sir William (1960)
 The Glorious First of June (1961)
 Great Sea Battles (1963)
 Admiral of the Fleet Cunningham of Hyndhope The Battle for the Mediterranean (1967)
 Marshal Mannerheim and the Finns (1967)
 The Navy (1968)
 The Life and Letters of Vice-Admiral Collingwood (1968)
 With Wolfe to Quebec published by Collins (1972)

Footnotes

Bibliography

1903 births
1976 deaths
People educated at Denstone College
20th-century British writers
British naval historians
Alumni of Gonville and Caius College, Cambridge
20th-century British historians